Grissly's Millions is a 1945 American mystery film directed by John English and written by Muriel Roy Bolton. The film stars Paul Kelly, Virginia Grey, Don Douglas, Elisabeth Risdon, Robert Barrat and Clem Bevans. The film was released on January 16, 1945, by Republic Pictures.

Plot

Cast  
Paul Kelly as Joe Simmons
Virginia Grey as Katherine Palmor Bentley
Don Douglas as Ellison Hayes 
Elisabeth Risdon as Leona Palmor
Robert Barrat as Grissly Morgan Palmor 
Clem Bevans as Old Tom
Eily Malyon as Mattie
Adele Mara as Maribelle
Francis Pierlot as Dr. Benny
Addison Richards as Henry Adams
Paul Fix as Lewis Bentley
Byron Foulger as Fred Palmor
Joan Blair as Mrs. Fred Palmor
Grady Sutton as Robert Palmor Jr.
Frank Jaquet as Robert Palmor Sr.
Will Wright as John Frey
Louis Mason as Gatekeeper
Tom London as Policeman Ralph

References

External links 
 

1945 films
American mystery films
1945 mystery films
Republic Pictures films
Films directed by John English
American black-and-white films
1940s English-language films
1940s American films